Tony Graham (born October 29, 1956) is a former professional tennis player from the United States.

During his career, he won two doubles titles. He achieved a career-high singles ranking of world No. 100 in 1980 and a career-high doubles ranking of world No. 88 in 1981.

Career finals

Singles (1 runner-up)

Doubles (2 titles, 1 runner-up)

External links
 
 

American male tennis players
People from North Hills, Los Angeles
Tennis players from Los Angeles
1956 births
Living people